The Assumption Greyhounds are the athletic sports teams for Assumption University. They are a member of the National Collegiate Athletic Association, specifically Division II. The Greyhounds are a member of the Northeast-10 Conference (NE-10). Assumption is also an administrative member of the New England Women's Hockey Alliance (NEWHA), one of the five conferences that compete at the NCAA's National Collegiate level (the effective equivalent of Division I) in women's ice hockey. Assumption joined the NEWHA for administrative purposes in 2022 in advance of its first season of varsity women's hockey in 2023–24.

Athletic facilities

Assumption College built a $3.2 million multi-sport stadium, which opened in September 2005. The stadium was the key capital project of the second phase of the Centennial Campaign. The stadium was constructed on the previous site of Assumption’s football/lacrosse field. The new facility supports six athletic teams (football, men's and women's lacrosse, men's and women’s soccer, and field hockey) and an outdoor intramural sports program on an infilled, synthetic turf field. It includes lights, elevated grandstand seating for approximately 1,200 spectators, a press box and a president's box.

Teams

Assumption University finished in the top six of the Northeast-10 President's Cup standings in 2014–15, 2015–16 and 2016–17. In 2015–16 the department finished a program-best third after winning conference championships in football and swimming and earning a runner-up finish in field hockey. In the fall of 2017, the football program won its second NE10 Title in the last three years and reached the NCAA Quarterfinals, where the program fell to Indiana (Pa.). The women's cross country program, meanwhile, placed second in the NE10 Championship and earned a second straight bid to the NCAA Championships – where they finished 27th. Field hockey advanced to the NE10 Title game, falling to eventual national champion LIU Post.

Notable alumni
 Deonte Harty – NFL wide receiver and All-Pro return specialist
 Jake Jones – NBA shooting guard
 Brian Kelly  – Head Football Coach at LSU
 Zach Triner – NFL long snapper

References

External links